The discography of Lorenzo Cherubini, an Italian singer-songwriter better known as Jovanotti, consists of seventeen studio albums, six compilation albums, a remix album, four live albums, four video albums and eighty-two singles, including seventy as a lead artist and twelve as a featured artist.

After releasing his debut single, "Walking", which became a minor hit in Italy during 1987, Jovanotti reached commercial success in 1988, when he released the single "Gimme Five", which topped the Italian Musica e dischi'''s Singles Chart. The song was later included in Jovanotti's first album, Jovanotti for President, which sold more than 400,000 copies in Italy and spawned three other top 5 singles in Italy.Jovanotti for presidentss follow-up, La mia moto, confirmed Jovanotti's success in his home country, selling more than 600,000 copies, while 1990's Giovani Jovanotti obtained a very poor commercial reception. During the next years, Jovanotti was able to re-gain popularity, scoring nine number-one albums in Italy between 1994 and 2012, including the greatest hits Lorenzo 1990-1995 and Backup - Lorenzo 1987-2012. 
As of 2012, Cherubini has also released eight number-one singles as a lead singer and two as a featured artists.

In the late 1980s, Jovanotti also released two dance singles under the pseudonym Gino Latino, while in 2003 he released a Latin music album, titled Roma, together with other musicians under the name Colletivo Soleluna.

During his career, Jovanotti recorded songs with several Italian and international artists, including Ben Harper, Michael Franti & Spearhead, Mousse T., Gianna Nannini, Pino Daniele, Negramaro, Luciano Ligabue and Piero Pelù.

As a songwriter, he adapted songs in Italian for Jarabe de Palo and Miguel Bosé and he penned original songs for several Italian artists, including Zucchero Fornaciari, Adriano Celentano, Giorgia and Irene Grandi.

 Albums 
Studio albums

Soundtrack albums

Compilation albums

Live albums

Side projects

Video albums

 Singles 
 As lead singer 
 1988–1989 

 1990–1994 

 1995–2004 

 2005–present 

 As featured artist 

 Other charted songs 

 Other album appearances 

 Music videos 

 Writing credits 

Notes

 A  "Mi fido di te" was only released as a digital single. Since the Italian Singles Chart was only based on physical sales until 1 January 2008, the song was not allowed to chart. However, in May 2006, it reached number 40 on the Italian FIMI Top Digital Download, which was established in March 2006.
 B  "Falla girare" was only released as a digital single. Since the Italian Singles Chart was only based on physical sales until 1 January 2008, the song was not allowed to chart. However, it reached number 25 on the Italian FIMI Top Digital Download in June 2006.
 C  "J'ai confiance en toi (Mi fido di te)" did not enter the Ultratop 50, but peaked at number 12 on the Wallonia Ultratip chart, which acts as a 30-song extension to the Ultratop 40.
 D'''  "Dove ho visto te" did not enter the Italian Singles Chart, but peaked at number 41 on the Italian FIMI Top Digital Download.

References

External links
 Jovanotti at Allmusic
 Jovanotti discography at Discogs
  Jovanotti at Discografia Nazionale della Canzone Italiana

Discographies of Italian artists